The 1991 FIFA Women's World Cup was the inaugural FIFA Women's World Cup, the world championship for women's national association football teams. It took place in Guangdong, China from 16 to 30 November 1991. FIFA, football's international governing body selected China as host nation as Guangdong had hosted a prototype world championship three years earlier, the 1988 FIFA Women's Invitation Tournament. Matches were played in the provincial capital, Guangzhou, as well as in Foshan, Jiangmen and Zhongshan. The competition was sponsored by Mars, Incorporated, maker of M&M's candy. With FIFA still reluctant to bestow their "World Cup" brand, the tournament was officially known as the 1st FIFA World Championship for Women's Football for the M&M's Cup.

It was won by the United States, whose captain April Heinrichs formed a forward line dubbed the "Triple-Edged Sword" with Carin Jennings and Michelle Akers-Stahl. Jennings was named player of the tournament while Akers-Stahl's ten goals won the Golden Shoe. The United States defeated Norway 2–1 in the final in front of a crowd of 63,000 people at Guangzhou's Tianhe Stadium. Total attendance for the tournament was 510,000, an average per match of 19,615. In the opening match at the same stadium, Norway was defeated 4–0 by hosts China. Chinese defender Ma Li scored the first goal in Women's World Cup history, while goalkeeper Zhong Honglian, also of China, posted the first official "clean sheet" in the tournament.

The 12 qualified teams were divided into three groups of four (A to C). The top two teams and the two best third-place finishers from the three groups advanced to the knockout round of eight teams. For only the first edition of the Women's World Cup, all matches lasted only 80 minutes, instead of the typical 90, and two points were awarded for a win (both of which would change in 1995).

Venues

Teams

Twelve teams qualified for the 1991 FIFA Women's World Cup final tournament. Each of the six FIFA confederations had at least one representative.

Squads
For a list of the squads that contended for the final tournament, see 1991 FIFA Women's World Cup squads.

Match officials
For the first time in FIFA competition, six female officials were included. All functioned as lineswomen, except for Cláudia Vasconcelos who took charge of the third place play-off; becoming the first woman to referee a match sanctioned by FIFA.

Tournament review
FIFA's technical report demonstrates that, after the tournament, players and officials were undecided whether to persist with 80-minute matches, or to change to 90 minutes in line with men's football. Opinion was also divided about the suitability of using a size five football. Some teams reported difficulty in sourcing good quality equipment in the correct size.

The tournament was considered a major success in the quality of play and attendances at the games. FIFA president João Havelange wrote that:

The perceived success of the tournament was a significant factor in the subsequent inclusion of women's football in the 1996 Summer Olympics. Sue Lopez reported that although attendances were very high, many tickets were complimentary. The "novelty factor" of women from foreign lands playing football also encouraged local people to attend.

Draw
The draw for the group stage was held on 14 September 1991 at the Tianhe Stadium in Guangzhou, China.

Group stage

Group A

Group B

Group C

⊕

Ranking of third-placed teams

Knockout stage

Bracket

Quarter-finals

Semi-finals

Third place play-off

Final

Awards

The following awards were given at the conclusion of the tournament:

Statistics

Goalscorers

Assists

Tournament ranking

See also

References

General references

External links
FIFA Women's World Cup China PR 1991, FIFA.com
FIFA Technical Report (Part 1) and (Part 2)
 

 
FIFA Women's World Cup tournaments
International women's association football competitions hosted by China
FIFA
1991 in Chinese football
November 1991 sports events in Asia
1991 in Chinese women's sport
Sports competitions in Guangdong